Ali Sadek Abou-Heif is an Egyptian lawyer  and a human rights scholar, described as one of the leading specialists in international public law and human rights in Egypt and more generally in the Arab world. He was Professor of International Public Law at the University of Alexandria. He was awarded the UNESCO Prize for Human Rights Education in 1981.

References

20th-century Egyptian lawyers
Living people
Egyptian human rights activists
Academic staff of Alexandria University
Year of birth missing (living people)